Dendrophryniscus brevipollicatus is a species of toad in the family Bufonidae. It is endemic to Brazil and found on the coastal ranges of São Paulo state and Rio de Janeiro states. It lives in terrestrial and epiphytic bromeliads, where it also places its eggs. It is a common species, although habitat loss can be a threat.

References

Amphibians of Brazil
Amphibians described in 1870
brevipollicatus
Endemic fauna of Brazil
Taxa named by Marcos Jiménez de la Espada
Taxonomy articles created by Polbot